Tapoco is an unincorporated community in Graham County, North Carolina, United States. Named for the acronym of the former Tallassee Power Company, Tapoco had a post office until it closed on October 26, 1995.

References

Unincorporated communities in Graham County, North Carolina
Unincorporated communities in North Carolina